General elections were held in East Germany on 2 July 1967. 434 deputies were elected to the Volkskammer, with all of them being candidates of the single-list National Front, dominated by the communist Socialist Unity Party of Germany. 583 Front candidates were put forward, with 434 being elected. The allocation of seats remained unchanged from the 1963 election.

Results

References

 Inter-Parliamentary Union: HISTORICAL ARCHIVE OF PARLIAMENTARY ELECTION RESULTS - Germany

1967 in East Germany
Elections in East Germany
1967 elections in Germany
July 1967 events in Europe
East Germany